Prides Crossing is a neighborhood of Beverly, Massachusetts

Prides Crossing or Pride's Crossing may refer to:
Prides Crossing station, a railroad station in the neighborhood
Pride's Crossing, a 1997 play by Tina Howe
Pride's Crossing, a 1950 play by Victor Wolfson